Dobrzyń  is a little village in the administrative district of Gmina Nidzica, within Nidzica County, Warmian-Masurian Voivodeship, in northern Poland.
It is famous for its high-quality goat milk and many thieves.

The village has a population of 150.

References

Villages in Nidzica County